I Loved Her First is the only studio album by the American country music band Heartland. Issued in 2006, it includes the single "I Loved Her First", a number one on the Billboard Hot Country Songs charts. Also released from this album were the singles "Built to Last" (number 58 on Hot Country Songs) and "Let's Get Dirty" (failed to chart). The track "(There's) No Gettin' Over Me" is a cover version of Ronnie Milsap's number one country hit from 1981.

Track listing

Personnel

Heartland
Jason Albert – lead vocals
Craig Anderson – acoustic guitar
Todd Anderson – drums
Chuck Crawford – fiddle, acoustic guitar, background vocals
Mike Myerson – lead guitar
Keith West – bass guitar, background vocals

Additional musicians
Walt Aldridge
Jim "Moose" Brown
J. T. Corenflos
Glen Duncan
Larry Franklin
Mark Matejka
Danny Parks

Chart performance

Weekly charts

Year-end charts

Singles

References

External links
[ I Loved Her First] at Allmusic

2006 debut albums
Lofton Creek Records albums
Heartland (band) albums